Raymond F. Palmer is an associate professor of family and community medicine at the University of Texas Health Science Center at San Antonio (UTHSCSA), a post he has held since 2003. His area of expertise is biostatistics.

In one study, Palmer et al. correlated Environmental Protection Agency data about the release of mercury in 254 Texas counties with special education cases and autism diagnoses in the state's 1,200 school districts. At a press conference, Palmer stated that "This is not a definitive study, but just one more that furthers the association between environmental mercury and autism." Thomas Lewandowski stated in a viewpoint that "... the conclusions drawn from the analysis are questionable", and Palmer told WebMD that this type of study is not necessarily proof of a causative link between mercury and autism.

Palmer has studied baby teeth for environmental toxins the children could have been exposed to during the prenatal period; this research was funded by a Suzanne and Bob Wright Trailblazer grant from Autism Speaks. He has also studied the differences in autism rates between Hispanic children and white children, and has concluded that the former are less likely to be diagnosed with the disorder than the latter. He says that this difference is unlikely to be solely an artifact of socioeconomic factors.

Education
Palmer has a bachelor's degree in psychology from Long Beach State University (1980), as well as an M.A. in psychology from California State University, Dominguez Hills (1985) and a PhD in preventive medicine from the University of Southern California (1995).

References

Autism researchers
Biostatisticians
Keck School of Medicine of USC alumni
Living people
University of Texas Health Science Center at San Antonio faculty
Year of birth missing (living people)